Teresa Mary "Tessie" O'Shea (13 March 1913 – 21 April 1995) was a Welsh entertainer and actress.

Early life 
O'Shea was born in Plantagenet Street in Riverside, Cardiff to newspaper wholesaler James Peter O'Shea, who had been a soldier and who was the son of Irish emigrants, and his wife Nellie Theresa Carr. O'Shea was reared in the British music hall tradition and performed on stage as early as age six, billed as "The Wonder of Wales". Convalescing after a serious illness in Weston-super-Mare, one day on the beach, the young O'Shea wandered off from her mother into the tent of a troupe of travelling performers and was only discovered when her mother recognised her singing Ernie Mayne's "An N'Egg and some N'Ham and some N'Onion"

Career
By her teens she was known for her BBC Radio broadcasts and appeared on stages in Britain and South Africa. She frequently finished her act by singing and playing a banjolele in the style of George Formby. While appearing in Blackpool in the 1930s, she capitalised on her size by adopting "Two Ton Tessie from Tennessee" as her theme song. In the 1940s, she was a frequent headliner at the London Palladium, and established herself as a recording artist in the 1950s.

In 1963, Noël Coward created the part of the fish and chips peddler "Ada Cockle" specifically for O'Shea in his Broadway musical, The Girl Who Came to Supper. Her performance of traditional Cockney tunes charmed the critics and helped win her a Tony Award for Best Featured Actress in a Musical.

In 1963, O'Shea was a guest on The Ed Sullivan Show. She was popular enough that she came back in 1964 and shared the billing with the Beatles. Their joint appearance drew what was then the largest audience in the history of American television, helping bring her to American audiences. She was a member of the repertory company on the short-lived CBS variety show The Entertainers (1964–65). In 1968, O'Shea was cast in the television movie The Strange Case of Dr. Jekyll and Mr. Hyde, which earned her an Emmy Award nomination for Outstanding Performance by an Actress in a Supporting Role in a Drama.

O'Shea starred in a short-lived British sitcom As Good Cooks Go, which ran from 1969 to 1970. She appeared in films including London Town, The Blue Lamp, The Shiralee, The Russians Are Coming, the Russians Are Coming, and Bedknobs and Broomsticks. She regularly appeared on BBC Television's long running variety show, The Good Old Days.

Death and legacy 
O'Shea died of congestive heart failure at age 82, at her home in East Lake Weir, Marion County, Florida.

O'Shea's life was celebrated in the BBC Two documentary Two Ton Tessie!, first broadcast in March 2011.

Filmography

References

External links
 
 

1913 births
1995 deaths
Actresses from Cardiff
Tony Award winners
Welsh expatriates in the United States
20th-century Welsh women singers
Welsh film actresses
Welsh musical theatre actresses
Welsh people of Irish descent
Welsh television actresses
Welsh women comedians
British ukulele players
20th-century British actresses
20th-century Welsh comedians